The 51033/51034 Mumbai Chhatrapati Shivaji Maharaj Terminus - Sainagar Shirdi Fast Passenger is an express train belonging to Indian Railways that run between Mumbai CSMT and Sainagar Shirdi in India. It operates as train number 51033 from Mumbai CSMT to Sainagar Shirdi and as train number 51034 in the reverse direction.

Coaches

The 51033/51034 Shirdi Fast Passenger presently has 1 AC 3 tier, 2 Sleeper Class & 6 General Unreserved coaches also has two SLR coaches for ladies. As with most train services in India, Coach Composition may be amended at the discretion of Indian Railways depending on demand.

Service

The 51033 Mumbai CSMT - Shirdi Fast Passenger covers the distance of 455 kilometres in 12 hours 00 mins (37.92 km/hr) & 11 hours 30 mins as 51034 Shirdi - Mumbai CSMT Fast Passenger (39.57 km/hr).

Traction

A Dual traction WCAM 3 loco from Kalyan shed hauls the train from Mumbai CSMT until Sainagar Shiridi.

Timetable

51033 Shirdi Fast Passenger leaves Mumbai CSMT every day at 22:55 hrs IST and reaches Sainagar Shirdi at 10:55 hrs IST the next day.

51034 Shirdi CSMT Fast Passenger leaves Sainagar Shirdi every day at 16:40 hrs IST and reaches Mumbai CSMT at 04:10 hrs IST the next day.

See also
 Mumbai-Pune Passenger
 Mumbai CST - Pandharpur Fast Passenger

References 

Slow and fast passenger trains in India
Rail transport in Maharashtra
Transport in Shirdi
Transport in Mumbai